The 3rd (United Kingdom) Division is a regular army division of the British Army. It was created in 1809 by Arthur Wellesley, 1st Duke of Wellington, as part of the Anglo-Portuguese Army, for service in the Peninsular War, and was known as the Fighting 3rd under Sir Thomas Picton during the Napoleonic Wars. The division fought at the Battle of Waterloo, as well as during the Crimean War and the Second Boer War. As a result of bitter fighting in 1916, during the First World War, the division became referred to as the 3rd (Iron) Division, or the Iron Division or Ironsides. During the Second World War, the division (now known as the 3rd Infantry Division) fought in the Battle of France including a rearguard action during the Dunkirk Evacuation, and played a prominent role in the D-Day landings of 6 June 1944. The division was to have been part of a proposed Commonwealth Corps, formed for a planned invasion of Japan in 1945–46, and later served in the British Mandate of Palestine. During the Second World War, the insignia became the "pattern of three" — a black triangle trisected by an inverted red triangle, created by Bernard Montgomery to instil pride in his troops.

Napoleonic Wars

The division was part of the Allied British and Portuguese forces that took part in the Peninsular War. It fought at the Battle of Bussaco in September 1810, the Battle of Fuentes de Oñoro in May 1811 and the Battle of El Bodón in September 1811, before further combat at the Siege of Ciudad Rodrigo in January 1812, the Siege of Badajoz in March 1812 and the Battle of Salamanca in July 1812. It also fought at the Siege of Burgos in September 1812 and the Battle of Vitoria in June 1813. It then pursued the French army into France and saw action at the Battle of the Pyrenees in July 1813, the Battle of Nivelle in November 1813 and the Battle of the Nive in December 1813. After that it fought at the Battle of Orthez in February 1814 and the Battle of Toulouse in April 1814.

According to Picton, the fighting by the 3rd was so intense at the Battle of Vitoria, that the division lost 1,800 men (over one third of all Allied losses at the battle) having taken a key bridge and village, where they were subjected to fire by 40 to 50 cannons, and a counter-attack on the right flank (which was open because the rest of the army had not kept pace). The 3rd held their ground and pushed on with other divisions to capture the village of Arinez.

The 3rd Division was also present at the Battle of Quatre Bras and the Battle of Waterloo in the Waterloo campaign under the command of Lieutenant-General Sir Charles Alten K.C.B. (Count Carl von Alten).

Crimean War
The 3rd Division took part in the Crimean War and fought in the Battle of Alma and the Siege of Sevastopol. It was under the command of Lieutenant-General Sir Richard England.

Second Boer War
During the Second Boer War (1899–1902) the division began under the command of General Gatacre. In 1902 the army was restructured, and a 3rd Infantry division was established permanently at Bordon as part of the 1st Army Corps, comprising the 5th and 6th Infantry Brigades.

First World War

During the First World War the 3rd Division was a permanently established Regular Army division that was amongst the first to be sent to France at the outbreak of the war as part of the British Expeditionary Force (BEF). The 3rd Division served on the Western Front in France and Belgium for four years, from 1914 to 1918. During this time, it was nicknamed "The Iron Division". Its first commander during the war, Major-General Hubert Hamilton, was killed by shellfire near Béthune in October 1914. The division served in many major battles of the war, including the Battle of Mons and the subsequent Great Retreat, and later the First Battle of Ypres.

Inter-War Period
After the end of the First World War, the division was stationed in southern England where it formed part of Southern Command. In 1937, one of its brigades, the 9th Infantry Brigade, was commanded by Brigadier Bernard Montgomery. He assumed command of the 3rd Division shortly before Britain declared war on Germany in September 1939.

Second World War

The 3rd Infantry Division, under the command of Major General Bernard Montgomery, was sent overseas to France in late September 1939, just under a month after the outbreak of the Second World War. There the division became part of Lieutenant General Alan Brooke's II Corps of the British Expeditionary Force (BEF). However, unlike in the First World War, where the division was almost immediately engaged in desperate fighting, there was no action. Montgomery instantly began training the men of his division in a tough training regime. As with most of the rest of the BEF, training was severely hampered by a shortage of modern equipment.

In May 1940, after several months of relative inactivity, the German Army launched its attack in the west which resulted in the BEF being split up from the French Army, evacuated from Dunkirk. Due to Montgomery's strict training regime, the 3rd Division suffered comparatively few casualties and earned a reputation as one of the best British divisions in France. During the evacuation Montgomery was promoted to temporary command of II Corps and Brigadier Kenneth Anderson took temporary control of the division before, in July, Major General James Gammell assumed command.

For over a year after Dunkirk the composition of 3rd Division remained largely unchanged (except that the motorcycle battalion was converted into 3rd (RNF) Reconnaissance Regiment, Reconnaissance Corps). Then, in September 1941, the 7th Guards Brigade was transferred to help create the Guards Armoured Division, and, in November, the 37th Infantry Brigade Group joined the 3rd Division and was renumbered 7th Brigade with the following composition: The brigade anti-tank companies were disbanded during 1941 and 92nd (Loyals) Light Anti-Aircraft Regiment, Royal Artillery, formerly the 7th Battalion, Loyal Regiment (North Lancashire), joined the division in March 1942. In June 1942, 3rd Infantry Division was reorganised as a 'Mixed' Division, with 33rd Tank Brigade replacing 7th Infantry Brigade. By early 1943, the experiment with 'mixed' divisions was abandoned, and division reverted to being an infantry formation, 33rd Tank Brigade being replaced by 185th Infantry Brigade.

D-Day

The 3rd British Infantry Division was the first British formation to land at Sword Beach on D-Day, 6 June 1944, as part of the invasion of Normandy, part of the larger Operation Overlord. For the assault landing, 3rd British Division was organised as a Division Group, with other formations temporarily under its command. These included 27th Armoured Brigade (Sherman DD amphibious tanks) and 22nd Dragoons (Sherman Crab flail tanks), 1st Special Service Brigade and No. 41 (Royal Marine) Commando, 5th Royal Marine Independent Armoured Support Battery (Centaur IV close support tanks), 77 and 79 Assault Squadrons of 5th Assault Regiment, Royal Engineers (Churchill AVREs).

The division's own artillery were all self-propelled (field regiments: M7 Priest; anti-tank regiment: M10 tank destroyer) and the SP field guns and RM Centaurs were able to fire from their landing craft during the run-in to the beach. In addition, 3rd British Division had 101 Beach Sub-Area HQ and Nos 5 and 6 Beach groups under command for the assault phase: these included additional engineers, transport, pioneers, medical services and vehicle recovery sections.

The 3rd Division's brigades were organised as brigade groups for the assault, with 8 Brigade Group making the first landing, followed by 185 Brigade Group and 9 Brigade Group in succession during the morning and early afternoon.

After D-Day

After D-Day the 3rd Infantry Division fought through the Battle for Caen, in Operation Charnwood and Operation Goodwood. With the fighting in Normandy over after the Battle of the Falaise Gap, the division also participated in the Allied advance from Paris to the Rhine and fought in the Netherlands and Belgium and later the Allied invasion of Germany. For the campaign in Normandy, the division was commanded by Major-General Tom Rennie until he was wounded on 13 June 1944; Major-General 'Bolo' Whistler, a highly popular commander, took command on 23 June 1944. During the campaign in Normandy, the division won its first Victoria Cross of the Second World War, awarded in August 1944 to Corporal Sidney Bates of 1st Battalion, Royal Norfolk Regiment, part of the 185th Brigade. Private James Stokes of the 2nd Battalion, King's Shropshire Light Infantry, also of the 185th Brigade, was the second recipient awarded the Victoria Cross in March 1945.

During the often intense fighting from Sword Beach to Bremen, the 3rd Division suffered 2,586 killed with over 12,000 wounded.

Cold War
Postwar, the division was reformed on 1 April 1951, in the Suez Canal Zone, under the command of Sir Hugh Stockwell. The division became part of Middle East Land Forces. It consisted of three recently reraised brigades, the 32nd Guards, the 19th Infantry, and the 39th Infantry. It served in the UK for many years and was part of Army Strategic Command in 1968. It had elements of 5th, 19th, and 24th Brigades attached to it.

During the 1970s the division consisted of two "square" brigades, the 6th Armoured Brigade and 33rd Armoured Brigade. It became 3rd Armoured Division in 1976 and served with I (BR) Corps being based at St Sebastian Barracks in Soest near the Möhne Dam from 1977. After being briefly reorganised into two "task forces" ("Echo" and "Foxtrot") in the late 1970s, it consisted of the 4th Armoured Brigade, the 6th Airmobile Brigade and the 19th Infantry Brigade in the 1980s.

Post–Cold War
In September 1992, the headquarters of 3rd Armoured Division was relocated from Germany to Bulford, Wiltshire in the UK, where it became 3rd Mechanised Division. It provided the headquarters for Multi-National Division (South-West) in Bosnia-Herzegovina in 1995 / 1996 and again in 1998. In early 2002, the division headquarters and its GOC, Major General John McColl, formed the initial basis of the headquarters of the International Security Assistance Force in Kabul, Afghanistan.

On 1 September 1999 the division was freed from its administrative and regional responsibilities and became a deployable or "fly-away" division. As 3rd (UK) Mechanised Division it was the only division at continual operational readiness in the United Kingdom (the other at operational readiness being 1st (UK) Armoured Division in Germany). It was based at Picton Barracks, Bulford Camp, and reported to the Commander Land Forces at Andover.

On 11 July 2003, the division deployed to Iraq to replace the British 1st Armoured Division, signalling the start of Operation Telic II. The 3rd Division also controlled numerous other coalition forces in southeast Iraq, including contingents from the Czech Republic, Denmark, Italy, Lithuania, the Netherlands, New Zealand and Norway.

Under Army 2020, the division was renamed as 3rd (United Kingdom) Division and continued to be based at Bulford Camp and to command the Reaction Force. In 2015, Brigadier General Mike Tarsa of the United States Army was assigned as deputy commanding general of the division.  He was replaced in May 2016 by Brigadier General Doug Crissman. Crissman was replaced by Brigadier General Matthew J. Van Wagenen in April 2018. This was part of a growing practice for senior officers of the British Army and the United States Army to be assigned as deputy commanders (and effectively liaison officers) in each other's operational units.

Future 
Under the Future Soldier programme, the division will be re-structured with the 1st Armoured Infantry Brigade becoming the Deep Reconnaissance Strike Brigade Combat Team, the 12th Armoured Infantry Brigade becoming 12th Armoured Brigade Combat Team, 20th Armoured Infantry Brigade becoming 20th Armoured Brigade Combat Team, 11th Signal Brigade reduced to just 7th Signals Group, and 1st Artillery Brigade disbanding.

Order of battle

3rd (UK) Mechanised Division (1990s)
 1st Mechanized Brigade
 4th Mechanized Brigade
 12th Mechanized Brigade
 3rd Division Headquarters and Signal Regiment
 5 Regiment Army Air Corps (Lynx)
 36 Engineer Regiment, Royal Engineers
 3 Regiment, Royal Military Police
 The Royal Wessex Yeomanry

3rd (United Kingdom) Division (2019–present)
 1st Armoured Infantry Brigade
 12th Armoured Infantry Brigade
 20th Armoured Infantry Brigade
 101 Logistic Brigade
 1st Artillery Brigade
 11th Signal Brigade
 1st Military Police Brigade -tactical command
 7 Air Defence Group
 25 (Close Support) Engineer Group

Recipients of the Victoria Cross
* indicates a posthumous award

See also

 List of commanders of the British 3rd Division
 List of British divisions in World War I
 List of British divisions in World War II
 British Army Order of Battle (September 1939)
 Units of the Royal Corps of Signals
 Death of Baha Mousa

Notes
Footnotes

Citations

References
 
 Blaxland, Gregory (1971) The Regiments Depart: A History of the British Army 1945–70, London: William Kimber.

Chappel M., (1986) British Battle Insignia (1). 1914–18 Osprey Publishing 

 Delaforce, Patrick (1995) Monty's Iron Sides, Stroud: Alan Sutton,
 Ellis, Major L.F. (2004) History of the Second World War: United Kingdom Military Series: Victory in the West, Volume I: The Battle of Normandy, London: HMSO, 1962/Uckfield: Naval & Military, .
 
 Horrocks, Lt-Gen Sir Brian, (1960) A Full Life, London: Collins.
 
 Keegan, John (1991), Churchill's Generals, London: Weidenfeld & Nicolson.
 Montgomery, Field Marshal Viscount, (1958) Memoirs, London: Collins.
 
 Scarfe, Norman (2006) [1947]. Assault Division: A History of the 3rd Division from the Invasion of Normandy to the Surrender of Germany. Stroud, Gloucestershire: Spellmount. .

External links
 3rd (UK) Division- on British Army official website
 British Military History: 3 Division (1930 - 1938)
 British Military History: 3 Infantry Division (1939)
 British Military History: 3 Infantry Division (1940)
 British Military History: 3 Infantry Division (1944-45)

Infantry divisions of the British Army in World War I
Infantry divisions of the British Army in World War II
Military units and formations established in 1809
1809 establishments in the United Kingdom
Military units and formations of the United Kingdom in the Peninsular War